Hyphessobrycon is a genus of freshwater fish in the family Characidae. These species are among the fishes known as tetras. The genus is distributed in the Neotropical realm from southern Mexico to Río de la Plata in Argentina. Many of these species are native to South America; about six species are from Central America and a single species, H. compressus is from southern Mexico.

Great anatomical diversity exists in this genus. They are generally of typical characin shape, but vary greatly in coloration and body form, many species having distinctive black, red, or yellow markings on their bodies and fins. These species are generally omnivorous, feeding predominantly on small crustaceans, insects, annelid worms, and zooplankton. When spawning, they scatter their eggs and guard neither eggs nor young.

Taxonomy
This large genus of characins includes over 150 species. The systematics of Hyphessobrycon are still largely unresolved. Six groups within this genus have been recognized based on color patterns alone. With no phylogenetic analysis of this genus, species are placed into this genus as anatomically defined by Carl H. Eigenmann in 1917. By this definition, Hyphessobrycon is identified by the presence of an adipose fin, incomplete lateral line, two tooth series in the premaxilla, with the teeth of the external series continuous in a single series, teeth not strictly conical, preventral scales arranged in more than one row and lack of scales in the caudal fin. The characteristic of extension of scales onto the caudal fin that differentiates this genus from Hemigrammus is not satisfactory, as it occurs in intermediate conditions.

This genus is not monophyletic. A monophyletic group within Hyphessobrycon has been hypothesized, termed the rosy tetra clade; this group is based upon coloration pattern and the shape of dorsal and anal fins of males. Recognition of monophyletic groups among Hyphessobrycon species is complicated by the difficulty in finding characters useful for hypothesis of relationships among the species. Traditional characters used to identify Hyphessobrycon are phylogenetically unreliable.

Etymology
The generic name, Hyphessobrycon, is of slightly uncertain origin. The second part derives from the Greek βρύκω (to bite); the first, derives from an ostensible Greek hyphesson, which may be an error for υπελάσσων (slightly smaller).

Relationship to humans

None of the roughly 100 fishes in the genus has been rated by the IUCN, but many species have small distributions and at least one, Hyphessobrycon flammeus, is believed to be highly threatened. This species only occurs in a few rivers and streams in coastal Rio de Janeiro State and in São Paulo State. Three other species are recognized as threatened in Brazil: H. coelestinus, H. duragenys, and H. taurocephalus.

Many Hyphessobrycon species are popular aquarium fish, and some, including H. flammeus, are bred in large numbers in captivity.

Species
The 156 currently recognized species in this genus are:

References

Characidae
Taxa named by Marion Durbin Ellis
Fish of South America
Freshwater fish genera
Tetras